Reprisal is an American streaming television drama series that premiered on Hulu on December 6, 2019. In June 2020, the series was canceled after one season.

Premise
Reprisal follows "a relentless femme fatale who, after being left for dead, leads a vengeful campaign against a bombastic gang of gearheads."

Cast and characters

Main
 Abigail Spencer as Katherine Harlow / Doris Quinn
 Rodrigo Santoro as Joel Kelly
 Mena Massoud as Ethan Hart
 Rhys Wakefield as Matty
 Madison Davenport as Meredith Harlow
 David Dastmalchian as Johnson
 Gilbert Owuor as Bash Brannigan 
 W. Earl Brown as Witt 
 Craig Tate as Earl
 Wavyy Jonez as Cordell
 Shane Callahan as Bru
 Rory Cochrane as Burt

Recurring
 Lea DeLaria as Queenie
 John Ventigmilia as Tolly
 Bethany Anne Lind as Molly Quinn / Grace
 Scarlett Blum as Lyla
 Louise Barnes as Rita
 Bill Sage as Jukes
 Blake Sheldon as Avron
 Ron Perlman as Big Graham

Episodes

Production

Development
On June 18, 2018, it was announced that Hulu had given the production a pilot order. The episode was written by Josh Corbin and directed by Jonathan Van Tulleken. Corbin also served as an executive producer alongside Warren Littlefield and Barry Jossen. Production companies involved with the pilot were A+E Studios and The Littlefield Company. On February 11, 2019, it was announced during the Television Critics Association's annual winter press tour that Hulu had given the production a series order. The series premiered on December 6, 2019. On June 10, 2020, Hulu canceled the series after one season.

Casting
In August 2018, it was announced that Abigail Spencer, Mena Massoud, David Dastmalchian, and Rhys Wakefield had been cast in the pilot's starring roles. On July 10, 2019, it was reported that Craig Tate, Wavyy Jonez, Shane Callahan, and Rory Cochrane were cast as series regulars. On July 22, 2019, Lea DeLaria was cast in a recurring role.

Filming
The pilot episode was filmed in Wilmington, North Carolina, and the rest of the first season will also be filmed in Wilmington.

Reception
On Rotten Tomatoes, the series holds an approval rating of 44% with an average rating of 7/10, based on 16 reviews. The website's critical consensus reads, "Solid performances and a fast pace move Reprisal along, but its style over substance approach is all pulp, little juice." On Metacritic, it has a weighted average score of 53 out of 100, based on 7 critics, indicating "mixed or average reviews".

References

External links

2010s American drama television series
2019 American television series debuts
2019 American television series endings
American thriller television series
Neo-noir television series
English-language television shows
Hulu original programming
Television shows filmed in North Carolina
Television shows filmed in Wilmington, North Carolina
Television series about revenge